The Karbala (also known as MIG-S-3700) is a class of Landing Ship Logistics operated by the Islamic Republic of Iran Navy.

History
The ship is assembled at Shahid Darvishi Marine Industries, Bandar Abbas.

Ships in the class
Known ships in commission the class are:

According to 2015 edition of Jane's Fighting Ships, there are more ships of this class in commercial service and navy can acquire more in case they are required.

References 

Ships built at Shahid Darvishi shipyard
Amphibious warfare vessel classes
Ship classes of the Islamic Republic of Iran Navy